Euxesta leucomelas is a species of ulidiid or picture-winged fly in the genus Euxesta of the family Ulidiidae. Its distribution is in Mexico, Central America and South America.

References

leucomelas
Insects described in 1860